Trichaeta pterophorina is a moth in the subfamily Arctiinae. It was described by Paul Mabille in 1892. It is found in the Republic of the Congo, the Democratic Republic of the Congo, Somalia, South Africa, Zambia and Zimbabwe.

References

Moths described in 1892
Arctiinae